The Fort de Bois l'Abbé, or Fort Poniatowski, is part of the fortifications of Épinal, France. It was built near the village of Uxegney between 1883 and 1885. It is an example of a Séré de Rivières system fortification. It escaped significant alteration in the years prior to World War I and is maintained as a museum.

Description
Its stone construction provides an excellent example of an un-modified Séré de Rivières position. The four-sided fort is somewhat smaller than the Fort d'Uxegney, with caponiers defending the protective ditch in lieu of the more modern counterscarps of Uxegney. It was constructed in 1884-1885 to watch the road from Domèvre-sur-Aviėre. A program of reinforcement was proposed in 1911, but never pursued. Original armament comprised four 120mm guns and two 90mm guns, with additional smaller arms. It was upgraded with 75mm anti-aircraft guns in 1915, while the larger guns had been removed. The fort lost strategic importance as it became clear that its views were obstructed by the Bois de Souche. A number of smaller positions were built in the Bois de Souche in lieu of improving the main fort. These were not completed at the time of mobilization in 1914.

Between 1900 and 1906 infantry shelters of a spiral queue de cochon or "pig's tail design were installed around the fort. In 1913-14 the fort received electricity, fed from the local power grid. The fort served as a central bakery, providing bread to the Fort d'Uxegney and the Fort de la Grande Haye.

History

The Fort de Bois de l'Abbé saw no action during World War I, as the Germans did not advance into the area around Épinal. Concrete platforms were placed on the surface of the fort for 75mm anti-aircraft guns following the aerial bombardment of Épinal, but the guns were never installed.

Between World War I and World War II the fort remained military property and was used as an ammunition depot. During World War II the Germans used Bois l'Abbé to house occupying forces and continued to use it for ammunition storage. 

The French army maintained an ammunition depot at the Fort de Bois l'Abbé until 1960. The fort may be visited on special occasions.

References

External links
Site de l'Association pour la Restauration du Fort d'Uxegney et de la Place d'Epinal 
Fort de Bois l'Abbé at fortiffsere.fr 

Séré de Rivières system
Fortifications of Épinal
World War I museums in France
Ammunition dumps